Vnajnarje (in older sources also Vnanjarje) is a settlement in the hills to the east of the capital Ljubljana in central Slovenia. It belongs to the City Municipality of Ljubljana. It is part of the traditional region of Lower Carniola and is now included with the rest of the municipality in the Central Slovenia Statistical Region.

References

External links
Vnajnarje on Geopedia

Populated places in the City Municipality of Ljubljana
Sostro District